Noah's Ark (Biblical Hebrew: Tevat Noaḥ) is the vessel in the Genesis flood narrative through which God spares Noah, his family, and examples of all the world's animals from a global deluge. The story in Genesis is repeated, with variations, in the Quran, where the Ark appears as Safinat Nūḥ ( "Noah's ship") and al-fulk (Arabic: الفُلْك).

Early Christian and Jewish writers believed that Noah’s Ark existed, and unsuccessful searches for Noah's Ark have been made from at least the time of Eusebius (c. 275–339 CE); believers in the Ark continue to search for it in modern times, but no confirmable physical proof of the Ark has ever been found. No scientific evidence has been found that Noah's Ark existed as it is described in the Bible. More significantly, there is also no evidence of a global flood, and most scientists agree that such a ship and natural disaster would both be impossible. Some researchers believe that a real (though localized) flood event in the Middle East could potentially have inspired the oral and later written narratives; a Persian Gulf flood, or a Black Sea Deluge 7,500 years ago has been proposed as such a historical candidate.

Description
The structure of the Ark (and the chronology of the flood) is homologous with the Jewish Temple and with Temple worship. Accordingly, Noah's instructions are given to him by God (Genesis 6:14–16): the ark is to be 300 cubits long, 50 cubits wide, and 30 cubits high (approximately ). These dimensions are based on a numerological preoccupation with the number 60, the same number characterizing the vessel of the Babylonian flood hero. 

Its three internal divisions reflect the three-part universe imagined by the ancient Israelites: heaven, the earth, and the underworld. Each deck is the same height as the Temple in Jerusalem, itself a microcosmic model of the universe, and each is three times the area of the court of the tabernacle, leading to the suggestion that the author saw both Ark and tabernacle as serving for the preservation of human life. It has a door in the side, and a tsohar, which may be either a roof or a skylight. It is to be made of gopher wood, a word which appears nowhere else in the Bible – and divided into qinnim, a word which always refers to birds' nests elsewhere in the Bible, leading some scholars to emend this to qanim, reeds. The finished vessel is to be smeared with koper, meaning pitch or bitumen; in Hebrew the two words are closely related, kaparta ("smeared") ... bakopper.

Origins

Mesopotamian precursors

For well over a century, scholars have recognized that the Bible's story of Noah's Ark is based on older Mesopotamian models. Because all these flood stories deal with events that allegedly happened at the dawn of history, they give the impression that the myths themselves must come from very primitive origins, but the myth of the global flood that destroys all life only begins to appear in the Old Babylonian period (20th–16th centuries BCE). The reasons for this emergence of the typical Mesopotamian flood myth may have been bound up with the specific circumstances of the end of the Third Dynasty of Ur around 2004 BCE and the restoration of order by the First Dynasty of Isin.

Nine versions of the Mesopotamian flood story are known, each more or less adapted from an earlier version. In the oldest version, inscribed in the Sumerian city of Nippur around 1600 BCE, the hero is King Ziusudra. This story, the Sumerian flood myth, probably derives from an earlier version. The Ziusudra version tells how he builds a boat and rescues life when the gods decide to destroy it. This basic plot is common in several subsequent flood stories and heroes, including Noah. Ziusudra's Sumerian name means "He of long life." In Babylonian versions, his name is Atrahasis, but the meaning is the same. In the Atrahasis version, the flood is a river flood.

The version closest to the biblical story of Noah, as well as its most likely source, is that of Utnapishtim in the Epic of Gilgamesh. A complete text of Utnapishtim's story is a clay tablet dating from the seventh century BCE, but fragments of the story have been found from as far back as the 19th-century BCE. The last known version of the Mesopotamian flood story was written in Greek in the third century BCE by a Babylonian priest named Berossus. From the fragments that survive, it seems little changed from the versions of 2,000 years before.

The parallels between Noah's Ark and the arks of Babylonian flood heroes Atrahasis and Utnapishtim have often been noted. Atrahasis' Ark was circular, resembling an enormous quffa, with one or two decks. Utnapishtim's ark was a cube with six decks of seven compartments, each divided into nine subcompartments (63 subcompartments per deck, 378 total). Noah's Ark was rectangular with three decks. A progression is believed to exist from a circular to a cubic or square to rectangular. The most striking similarity is the near-identical deck areas of the three arks: 14,400 cubits2, 14,400 cubits2, and 15,000 cubits2 for Atrahasis, Utnapishtim, and Noah, only 4% different. Professor Finkel concluded, "the iconic story of the Flood, Noah, and the Ark as we know it today certainly originated in the landscape of ancient Mesopotamia, modern Iraq."

Linguistic parallels between Noah's and Atrahasis' arks have also been noted. The word used for "pitch" (sealing tar or resin) in Genesis is not the normal Hebrew word, but is closely related to the word used in the Babylonian story. Likewise, the Hebrew word for "ark" (tevah) is nearly identical to the Babylonian word for an oblong boat (ṭubbû), especially given that "v" and "b" are the same letter in Hebrew: bet (ב).

However, the causes for God or the gods sending the flood differ in the various stories. In the Hebrew myth, the flood inflicts God's judgment on wicked humanity. The Babylonian Epic of Gilgamesh gives no reasons, and the flood appears the result of divine caprice. In the Babylonian Atrahasis version, the flood is sent to reduce human overpopulation, and after the flood, other measures were introduced to limit humanity.

Composition

A consensus among scholars indicates that the Torah (the first five books of the Bible, beginning with Genesis) was the product of a long and complicated process that was not completed until after the Babylonian exile. Since the 18th century, the flood narrative has been analysed as a paradigm example of the combination of two different versions of a story into a single text, with one marker for the different versions being a consistent preference for different names "Elohim" and "Yahweh" to denote God.

Genesis flood narrative

The Genesis flood narrative closely parallels the story of the creation: a cycle of creation, un-creation, and re-creation, in which the Ark plays a pivotal role. The universe as conceived by the ancient Hebrews comprised a flat, disk-shaped Earth with the heavens above and Sheol, the underworld of the dead, below. These three were surrounded by a watery "ocean" of chaos, protected by the firmament, a transparent but solid dome resting on the mountains that ringed the earth. Noah's three-deck Ark represents this three-level Hebrew cosmos in miniature: heavens, earth, and waters beneath. In Genesis 1, God created the three-level world as a space in the midst of the waters for humanity; in Genesis 6–8, God refloods that space, saving only Noah, his family, and the animals in the Ark.

Religious views

Rabbinic Judaism

The Talmudic tractates Sanhedrin, Avodah Zarah, and Zevahim relate that, while Noah was building the Ark, he attempted to warn his neighbors of the coming deluge, but was ignored or mocked. God placed lions and other ferocious animals to protect Noah and his family from the wicked who tried to keep them from the Ark. According to one Midrash, it was God, or the angels, who gathered the animals and their food to the Ark. As no need existed to distinguish between clean and unclean animals before this time, the clean animals made themselves known by kneeling before Noah as they entered the Ark. A differing opinion is that the Ark itself distinguished clean animals from unclean, admitting seven pairs each of the former and one pair each of the latter.

According to Sanhedrin 108b, Noah was engaged both day and night in feeding and caring for the animals, and did not sleep for the entire year aboard the Ark. The animals were the best of their kind and behaved with utmost goodness. They did not procreate, so the number of creatures that disembarked was exactly equal to the number that embarked. The raven created problems, refusing to leave the Ark when Noah sent it forth, and accusing the patriarch of wishing to destroy its race, but as the commentators pointed out, God wished to save the raven, for its descendants were destined to feed the prophet Elijah.

According to one tradition, refuse was stored on the lowest of the Ark's three decks, humans and clean beasts on the second, and the unclean animals and birds on the top; a differing interpretation described the refuse as being stored on the topmost deck, from where it was shoveled into the sea through a trapdoor. Precious stones, as bright as the noon sun, provided light, and God ensured the food remained fresh.  In an unorthodox interpretation, the 12th-century Jewish commentator Abraham ibn Ezra interpreted the ark as a vessel that remained under water for 40 days, after which it floated to the surface.

Christianity

The First Epistle of Peter (composed around the end of the first century AD) compared Noah's salvation through water to Christian salvation through baptism. Hippolytus of Rome (died 235) sought to demonstrate that "the Ark was a symbol of the Christ who was expected", stating that the vessel had its door on the east side—the direction from which Christ would appear at the Second Coming—and that the bones of Adam were brought aboard, together with gold, frankincense, and myrrh (the symbols of the Nativity of Christ). Hippolytus furthermore stated that the Ark floated to and fro in the four directions on the waters, making the sign of the cross, before eventually landing on Mount Kardu "in the east, in the land of the sons of Raban, and the Orientals call it Mount Godash; the Armenians call it Ararat". On a more practical plane, Hippolytus explained that the lowest of the three decks was for wild beasts, the middle for birds and domestic animals, and the top for humans. He says male animals were separated from females by sharp stakes to prevent breeding.

The early Church Father and theologian Origen (circa 182–251), in response to a critic who doubted that the Ark could contain all the animals in the world, argued that Moses, the traditional author of the book of Genesis, had been brought up in Egypt and would therefore have used the larger Egyptian cubit. He also fixed the shape of the Ark as a truncated pyramid, square at its base, and tapering to a square peak one cubit on a side; only in the 12th century did it come to be thought of as a rectangular box with a sloping roof.

Early Christian artists depicted Noah standing in a small box on the waves, symbolizing God saving the Christian Church in its turbulent early years. Augustine of Hippo (354–430), in his work City of God, demonstrated that the dimensions of the Ark corresponded to the dimensions of the human body, which according to Christian doctrine is the body of Christ and in turn the body of the Church. Jerome (circa 347–420) identified the raven, which was sent forth and did not return, as the "foul bird of wickedness" expelled by baptism; more enduringly, the dove and olive branch came to symbolize the Holy Spirit and the hope of salvation and eventually, peace. The olive branch remains a secular and religious symbol of peace today.

Gnosticism
According to the Hypostasis of the Archons, a 3rd century Gnostic writing, Noah is chosen to be spared by the evil Archons when they try to destroy the other inhabitants of the Earth with the great flood. He is told to create the ark then board it at a location called Mount Sir, but when his wife Norea wants to board it as well, Noah attempts to not let her. So she decides to use her divine power to blow upon the ark and set it ablaze, therefore Noah is forced to rebuild it.

Islam

Abd Allah ibn Abbas, a contemporary of Muhammad, wrote that Noah was in doubt as to what shape to make the Ark and that Allah revealed to him that it was to be shaped like a bird's belly and fashioned of teak wood.

Abdallah ibn 'Umar al-Baidawi, writing in the 13th century, explains that in the first of its three levels, wild and domesticated animals were lodged, in the second human beings, and the third birds. On every plank was the name of a prophet. Three missing planks, symbolizing three prophets, were brought from Egypt by Og, son of Anak, the only one of the giants permitted to survive the flood. The body of Adam was carried in the middle to divide the men from the women. Surah 11:41 says: "And he said, 'Ride ye in it; in the Name of Allah it moves and stays!'"; this was taken to mean that Noah said, "In the Name of Allah!" when he wished the Ark to move, and the same when he wished it to stand still.

The medieval scholar Abu al-Hasan Ali ibn al-Husayn Masudi (died 956) wrote that Allah commanded the Earth to absorb the water, and certain portions which were slow in obeying received salt water in punishment and so became dry and arid. The water which was not absorbed formed the seas, so that the waters of the flood still exist. Masudi says the ark began its voyage at Kufa in central Iraq and sailed to Mecca, circling the Kaaba before finally traveling to Mount Judi, which surah 11:44 gives as its final resting place. This mountain is identified by tradition with a hill near the town of Jazirat ibn Umar on the east bank of the Tigris in the province of Mosul in northern Iraq, and Masudi says that the spot could be seen in his time.

Baháʼí Faith
The Baháʼí Faith regards the Ark and the Flood as symbolic. In Baháʼí belief, only Noah's followers were spiritually alive, preserved in the "ark" of his teachings, as others were spiritually dead. The Baháʼí scripture Kitáb-i-Íqán endorses the Islamic belief that Noah had numerous companions on the ark, either 40 or 72, as well as his family, and that he taught for 950 (symbolic) years before the flood. The Baháʼí Faith was founded in 19th century Persia, and it recognizes divine messengers from both the Abrahamic and the Indian traditions.

Ancient accounts

Multiple Jewish and Christian writers in the ancient world wrote about the ark.  The first-century historian Josephus reports that the Armenians believed that the remains of the Ark lay "in Armenia, at the mountain of the Cordyaeans", in a location they called the Place of Descent. He goes on to say that many other writers of "barbarian histories", including Nicolaus of Damascus, Berossus, and Mnaseas mention the flood and the Ark.

In the fourth century, Epiphanius of Salamis wrote about Noah’s Ark in his Panarion, saying "Thus even today the remains of Noah’s ark are still shown in Cardyaei."  Other translations render “Cardyaei” as “the country of the Kurds”.

John Chrysostom mentioned Noah’s Ark in one of his sermons in the fourth century, saying ""Do not the mountains of Armenia testify to it, where the Ark rested? And are not the remains of the Ark preserved there to this very day for our admonition?

Historicity
The first edition of the Encyclopædia Britannica from 1771 describes the Ark as factual. It also attempts to explain how the Ark could house all living animal types: "... Buteo and Kircher have proved geometrically, that, taking the common cubit as a foot and a half, the ark was abundantly sufficient for all the animals supposed to be lodged in it ... the number of species of animals will be found much less than is generally imagined, not amounting to a hundred species of quadrupeds." It also endorses a supernatural explanation for the flood, stating that "many attempts have been made to account for the deluge by means of natural causes: but these attempts have only tended to discredit philosophy, and to render their authors ridiculous."

The 1860 edition attempts to solve the problem of the Ark being unable to house all animal types by suggesting a local flood, which is described in the 1910 edition as part of a "gradual surrender of attempts to square scientific facts with a literal interpretation of the Bible" that resulted in "the 'higher criticism' and the rise of the modern scientific views as to the origin of species" leading to "scientific comparative mythology" as the frame in which Noah's Ark was interpreted by 1875.

Ark's geometry

In Europe, the Renaissance saw much speculation on the nature of the Ark that might have seemed familiar to early theologians such as Origen and Augustine. At the same time, however, a new class of scholarship arose, one which, while never questioning the literal truth of the ark story, began to speculate on the practical workings of Noah's vessel from within a purely naturalistic framework. In the 15th century, Alfonso Tostada gave a detailed account of the logistics of the Ark, down to arrangements for the disposal of dung and the circulation of fresh air. The 16th-century geometer Johannes Buteo calculated the ship's internal dimensions, allowing room for Noah's grinding mills and smokeless ovens, a model widely adopted by other commentators.

Irving Finkel, a curator at the British Museum, came into the possession of a cuneiform tablet. He translated it and discovered an hitherto unknown Babylonian version of the story of the great flood. This version gave specific measurements for an unusually large coracle (a type of rounded boat). His discovery lead to the production of a television documentary and a book summarizing the finding. A scale replica of the boat described by the tablet was built and floated in Kerala, India.

Searches for Noah's Ark

Searches for Noah's Ark have been made from at least the time of Eusebius (c.275–339 CE) to the present day. Today, the practice is widely regarded as pseudoarchaeology. Various locations for the ark have been suggested but have never been confirmed. Search sites have included Durupınar site, a site on Mount Tendürek in eastern Turkey and Mount Ararat, but geological investigation of possible remains of the ark has only shown natural sedimentary formations. While biblical literalists maintain the Ark's existence in archaeological history, much of its scientific feasibility along with that of the deluge has been contested.

Cultural legacy: Noah's Ark replicas 
In the modern era, individuals and organizations have sought to reconstruct Noah's ark using the dimensions specified in the Bible. Johan's Ark was completed in 2012 to this end, while the Ark Encounter was finished in 2016.

See also

 Biblical literalism
 Book of Noah
 Dwyfan and Dwyfach
 Gilgamesh flood myth
 İlandağ of the Lesser Caucasus in Nakhchivan, Azerbaijan
 List of topics characterized as pseudoscience
 Manu (Hinduism)
 Noah's Ark replicas and derivatives
 The Sinjar Mountains in Nineveh Governorate, Iraq
 Sons of Noah
 Wives aboard Noah's Ark
 Ziusudra

Notes

References

Citations

Bibliography

Further reading
Commentaries on Genesis

General

External links

 

 
Book of Genesis
Flood myths
Mythological ships
Noach (parashah)
Mount Ararat